Pierre Coquelin de Lisle (19 July 1900 – 22 July 1980) was a French sport shooter who competed in the 1924 Summer Olympics. In 1924 he won the gold medal in the 50 metre rifle, prone competition.

References

Further reading
 Pierre Lagrue, Serge Laget, 2015: Le Siècle olympique. Les Jeux et l'Histoire (Athènes, 1896-Londres, 2012), Encyclopaedia Universalis
 "Les hommes du jour: Pierre Coquelin de Lisle", in Le Petit Parisien, 26 July 1933 (online version)
 "Les jeux olympiques des tireurs: Le jeune tireur français Coquelin de Lisle est champion olympique à la carabine" (1st part), Le Matin, Paris, s.n. "41e année", no 12906,‎ 24 June 1924, p. 1 col. 4 and p.3 col. 5 (online version)

External links

1900 births
1980 deaths
French male sport shooters
ISSF rifle shooters
Olympic shooters of France
Shooters at the 1924 Summer Olympics
Olympic gold medalists for France
Olympic medalists in shooting
Medalists at the 1924 Summer Olympics
20th-century French people